Signs is the seventh studio album by American blues guitarist Jonny Lang, released on September 1 in Europe and on September 8 2017 in North America. The song "Stronger Together", premiered on Billboard on August 11.

It was chosen by AllMusic as one of the best blues albums of 2017.

Track listing

References

2017 albums